Parrot Sketch Not Included – 20 Years of Monty Python is a British television special to Monty Python, put together to celebrate the 20th anniversary of the debut of the comedy group's television series, Monty Python's Flying Circus. Produced by Tiger Aspect Productions for the BBC, it was compiled by noted British comedy producer John Lloyd and broadcast on BBC 1 on 18 November 1989.

Introduced by actor and Monty Python fan Steve Martin, the special features several sketches from Monty Python's Flying Circus, as well as some sketches from the two German specials Monty Python's Fliegender Zirkus. True to its title, the "Dead Parrot sketch" is not included. It concluded with the final appearance of all six Python members together, before Graham Chapman's death in October 1989.

The special was broadcast in the US on the Showtime network on 17 March 1990. This was 90 seconds shorter than the UK version due to a cut scene from the end of the pre-credits sequence which had Steve Martin revealing, via a slowed down clip of the Bruces sketch, that the Pythons were Satanists. This shorter version was released on VHS in the UK by CBS/Fox in 1990 and later on DVD in the US by A&E in 2001, as part of their Monty Python Live box set.

Sketches included
 Willam Tell
 The Merchant of Venice as performed by a herd of cows
 Silly Olympics
 Dennis Moore
 How Not To Be Seen
 Exploding Version of The Blue Danube
 Dennis Moore (again)
 World Forum/Communist Quiz
 The Philosophers' Football Match
 RAF Banter
 French Lecture on Sheep-Aircraft
 Conrad Poohs and His Dancing Teeth
 Architects Sketch
 How to Recognize a Mason
 The Ministry of Silly Walks
 Queen Victoria Handicap
 The Wacky Queen
 Working Class Playwright
 The Fish-Slapping Dance
 A man with a Stoat Through His Head
 Roy and Hank Spim – Mosquito hunters
 Sam Peckinpah's "Salad Days"
 Patient Abuse
 Hospital Run by RSM
 Come Back to My Place
 Homicidal Barber
 The Lumberjack Song
 Film Trailer
 Spam
 A man With a Tape Recorder up His Nose
 Musical Mice
 The Mouse Problem
 House Hunters
 Rival Documentaries
 Tchaikovsky Piano Concerto Escape Act
 Argument Clinic
 The Spanish Inquisition
 Bus Animation
 The Spanish Inquisition (again)
 And Then
 The Visitors
 Man-Powered Flight
 Raymond Luxury Yacht
 Television is Bad for Your Eyes
 Last Gumby announcement

Deleted sequence
Originally, a brand new sketch featuring the Monty Python members and Steve Martin was to be included in the special. Filmed at Twickenham Studios on 3 September 1989, the sequence featured the Monty Python members dressed as school boys, asking Martin questions and taking notes. Although present at the recording, Graham Chapman did not perform in the sketch. The sequence was removed at the Pythons' request, as Terry Jones explained: "There was this new sketch which featured us and Steve Martin. Somebody had cobbled this thing together and was passing it off, saying it was written by John or whatever. When I read it I thought, 'This is just terrible, we can't do this'. So we arrived and Steve Martin was there at the film studios. We had to turn up to do it and I'm very glad that they cut it". Footage of the Pythons meeting up to record the sketch was aired in the US version of the Life of Python documentary.

The Pythons gave an alternate version of their appearance, which is featured in the special, in which Steve Martin briefly reveals that they are all in a cupboard. Chapman appears very pale and sallow; at the time the throat cancer that would kill him was advancing rapidly. This would be his last filmed appearance before his death on 4 October 1989, which coincidentally was the day before the 20th anniversary of the broadcast of the first episode of Monty Python's Flying Circus.

Cast
 Graham Chapman
 John Cleese
 Terry Gilliam
 Eric Idle
 Terry Jones
 Michael Palin 
 Steve Martin
 Carol Cleveland
 Connie Booth
 Basil Tang
 Marjorie Wilde
 The Fred Tomlinson Singers

Credits
 Ian MacNaughton - Producer (original footage)
 John Howard Davies - Producer (original footage)
 Sue Vertue - Production Manager
 Charles Brand - Producer
 Anne James - Producer
 Martyn Hone - Editor
 John Lloyd - Editor

References

External links 

Monty Python retrospectives
1989 television specials
British television specials